The Simpson Tower, located at 401 Bay Street, is the 38th-tallest building in Toronto, Ontario, Canada. In 1978, as part of a corporate takeover, the Simpson Tower became the property of the Hudson's Bay Company. The building today remains the head office of HBC and also houses the head office of subsidiaries Hudson's Bay and Home Outfitters. It is adjacent to the historic Simpsons store at Yonge and Queen, which includes Arcadian Court. Today the store is the flagship for Hudson's Bay, is integrated with the Eaton Centre across Queen Street, and is the home of Toronto's comprehensive health centre.

In January 2014, Hudson's Bay Company announced it would sell the tower and adjacent store to Cadillac Fairview and lease the site for 25 years.

References 

Skyscrapers in Toronto
Office buildings completed in 1968
Modernist architecture in Canada
Hudson's Bay Company
Headquarters in Canada
Skyscraper office buildings in Canada